Maverick Rock or Maverick Stone ( or simply El Maverick) is a natural rock formation in Venezuela, on top of Mount Roraima. It is the highest point of that tabletop mountain (a tepui), at  a.m.s.l. The rock stands near the southwestern edge of the mountain plateau. Although Mount Roraima is shared with Guyana (in an area claimed by Venezuela) and Brazil, Maverick Rock is entirely within internationally recognized Venezuelan territory, in the state of Bolívar, of which it is the highest point.

The rock's name comes from the apparent similarity of its shape to a Ford Maverick automobile.

References 

Mountains of Venezuela
Landforms of Venezuela
Geography of Bolívar (state)
Mountains of Bolívar (state)